Neomariania partinicensis is a species of moth of the Stathmopodidae family. It is found in the Mediterranean area.

Their wingspan is 10–12 mm. Adults have been collected from the end of June to mid-September.

References

Stathmopodidae
Taxa named by Hans Rebel
Moths described in 1937
Moths of Europe